The Hot Box is a 1972 women in prison film from Joe Viola and Jonathan Demme, who had previously made Angels Hard as They Come (1971) for New World Pictures. It was shot in the Philippines and was originally known as The Prescription Revolution.

Plot
Four American nurses working in the Republic of San Rosario are kidnapped by a band of guerillas.

Cast
Carmen Argenziano as Flavio
Andrea Cagan as Bunny Kincaid
Margaret Markov as Lynn Forrest
Rickey Richardson as Ellie St. George
Laurie Rose as Sue Pennwright
Zaldy Zschornack as Ronaldo Montoya
Jose Romulo as Crao
Rocco Montalban as Carragiero
Charles Dierkop as The journalist Garcia, also known as Major Dubay
Gina Laforteza as Florida
Ruben Ramos as Mimmo
Ruben Rustia

Production
The film came about because Roger Corman had a production deal in the Philippines with a young producer there, Cirio Santiago. Corman wanted to give Santiago a story outline and Viola did up a treatment in an afternoon, which became the film. Jonathan Demme shot some second unit footage, which impressed Roger Corman enough to support Demme's debut as director, Caged Heat (1974).

See also
 List of American films of 1972

References

External links

1972 films
1970s exploitation films
Women in prison films
New World Pictures films
Films shot in the Philippines
1970s prison drama films
1970s English-language films
American exploitation films
American prison drama films
1970s American films